Coiled-coil domain-containing protein 80 is a protein that in humans is encoded by the CCDC80 gene. Bioinformatics analysis suggests the CCDC80 protein is a peroxiredoxin.

References

External links

Further reading

Extracellular matrix proteins